Rocket Red is a superhero appearing in the DC Comics universe. Created by Steve Englehart and Joe Staton, he first appeared in Green Lantern Corps #208 (January 1987), appearing shortly afterward in Justice League in issue #3 (July 1987); Rocket Red was inducted into the Justice League in Justice League #7 (November 1987). 

The term "Rocket Reds" refers to any member of the Rocket Red Brigade; the name in the singular is used to refer to the three individual characters named Rocket Red who were members of the Justice League. These comprise the original Rocket Red #7 (later revealed as an android), Dmitri Pushkin (Rocket Red #4) and Gavril Ivanovich.

Fictional character biography

Dmitri Pushkin

Dmitri Pushkin (Rocket Red #4) became a member of the Justice League International after the previously assigned Rocket Red #7 was revealed to be a Manhunter android. A kind-hearted and jolly man with a taste for American culture, Dimitri served with the Justice League International for many years.

When his armor was destroyed by Lobo, he replaced it with a more advanced model made on Apokolips. This happened during a small-team Justice League mission to save Mister Miracle. He also suffered the destruction of his battle suit while facing Time Commander in Animal Man #16 (Oct 1989), when Dimitri served with Justice League Europe. During this time, Maxwell Lord made arrangements with the Russian government for Dmitri's wife, Belina, and his two children, Mischa and Tascha, to live with him at the League's Paris embassy. He also became friends with Buddy Baker, in a manner similar to the friendship of Blue Beetle and Booster Gold. Dimitri and Buddy initially bonded because they both had wives and children.

Dmitri is featured in the second Captain Atom Annual, helping to defend the country of Bialya from various threats.

In Justice League Europe #28, Dimitri was part of the resistance against Starro because his armor prevented the alien from controlling his mind. Dmitri was neutralized when Starro threatened to harm his family. He willingly surrendered to the alien's control to keep them safe. Other Justice League members eventually defeated the menace.

Later, Dmitri and most of the Reds are taken over by the sound-using criminal Sonar. In the same issue, Russian government reports have him listed as retired.

Dimitri was the only European on the team initially. He retired from super-heroics for a long time before dying in The OMAC Project, self-destructing to save the other members of the old JLI. His last words to Booster Gold were "My wife and children, Michael ... tell them I love them".

In the Booster Gold series, Rocket Red's grandfather, Dr. Sergei Pushkin, was a Russian scientist working with the U.S. on the space race in 1952. Task Force X was given a mission to expose Pushkin as a traitor to the American cause. Thanks to Pushkin, the launch was ahead of schedule, and the Russians were conducting a flight to outer space that night. Booster Gold traveled through time to stop it, giving a diversion to Task Force X to apprehend Pushkin without exposing him. Pushkin became more careful, and the space program started to lag behind until he was exposed by Frank Rock as a traitor in 1954. Because he was a valuable source, the U.S. placed him under house arrest where he worked on the Rocket Red armor in secret until he was sprung in 1957 by the Soviets. He did not live to see his work completed, and it was up to his son, Dimitri, to finish the suit. The legacy of the Rocket Reds was secure until 1962.

In Blackest Night #3, Rocket Red was reanimated as a member of the Black Lanterns and is shown attacking the Rocket Red Brigade.

Gavril Ivanovich
The 2010 ongoing series Justice League: Generation Lost introduced a new Rocket Red named Gavril Ivanovich. In this title, several members of the erstwhile JLI, pursuing a group of OMACs controlled by the resurrected Maxwell Lord, encounter a fight among a group of Rocket Reds, whose infighting was triggered by renegade Rocket Red (Gavril Ivanovich), who remains loyal to the old Communist cause and is resistant to the capitalist values of the modern Rocket Red brigade. He also sports a bulkier, outdated suit of armor that resembles Pushkin's armor rather than the sleek, modern suits worn by the other members of the brigade. The Justice League members intervene to prevent collateral damage, and Ivanovich joins the group (somewhat to their initial reluctance) in a move that paralleled Pushkin's choice to join the original JLI years earlier. Gavril cements his membership in the new group during a fight against the Checkmate organization, suffering serious injuries but earning the team's respect. While the team deals with the apparent loss of Blue Beetle, Gavril bonds with Fire. He shares his insecurities about being thought of as a joke by his teammates due to his poor grasp of the English language, and the two grow close, eventually sharing a passionate kiss. During the final battle against Lords' army of OMACs, Gavril's armor is heavily damaged. Once Lord is temporarily defeated and the battle ends, the injured Gavril sets out to repair his suit.

In September 2011, The New 52 rebooted DC's continuity. In this new timeline, Gavril is reintroduced in the ongoing series Justice League International as a member of a United Nations-assembled superhero team led by Booster Gold. He immediately clashes with August General in Iron, the team's Chinese representative, but their relationship evolves into an escalation of patriotic posturing leading to their mutual respect. After helping to repel an invasion by the alien conqueror Peraxxus, Gavril is killed in an explosion during a press conference introducing the team.

Powers and abilities
The Rocket Reds were originally created for the Soviet Union by Kilowog and the Rocket Red Brigade —normal human beings enhanced using "forced evolution" and armored battle suits— proudly defended the USSR.

Their abilities included super strength, invulnerability, rocket-powered flight, the ability to project powerful energy blasts, and "mecha-empathy"—the ability to sense and control computers and machines.

Other versions
Rocket Red Brigade is featured in the Smallville Season 11 digital comic based on the TV series.

In other media

Television
 An unidentified Rocket Red resembling Dmitri Pushkin / Rocket Red No. 4 makes non-speaking appearances in Justice League Unlimited as part of the expanded Justice League.
 The Dmitri Pushkin incarnation of Rocket Red makes a non-speaking appearance in the Batman: The Brave and the Bold episode "Crisis: 22,300 Miles Above Earth!". This version is a member of Justice League International.
 The Dmitri Pushkin incarnation of Rocket Red appears in the Young Justice episode "Leverage", voiced by Steve Blum. This version is a new member of the Rocket Red Brigade who forcibly bonds himself to his suit to help his commander, Rocket Red No. 1, repel Task Force X.

Toys
 Rocket Red was released as a single packed action figure in Mattel's Justice League Unlimited DC Superheroes toy line.
 Rocket Red has also become part of Mattel's DC Universe Classics-based Signature Series, as a distinctly larger figure available through Mattel's online outlet at MattyCollector.Com.

See also
 Rocket Red Brigade

References
 

Articles about multiple fictional characters
Comics characters introduced in 1987
DC Comics superheroes
DC Comics male superheroes
DC Comics characters with superhuman strength
Fictional technopaths
DC Comics robots
Characters created by Judd Winick
Characters created by Steve Englehart
Comics characters introduced in 2010
Fictional Soviet people
Soviet Union-themed superheroes
Fictional Soviet Army personnel